"Miracle" is a song by Japanese singer-songwriter Rina Aiuchi. It was released on 3 May 2006 through Giza Studio, as the fourth single from her fifth studio album Delight. The single reached number eleven in Japan and has sold over 10,500 copies nationwide. The song served as the theme songs to the Japanese anime television series, MÄR Heaven.

Track listing

Charts

Certification and sales

|-
! scope="row"| Japan (RIAJ)
| 
| 10,500
|-
|}

Release history

References

2006 singles
2006 songs
J-pop songs
Song recordings produced by Daiko Nagato
Songs written by Aika Ohno
Songs written by Rina Aiuchi